José Messias da Cunha (October 7, 1928 – June 12, 2015), or simply José Messias, was a Brazilian composer, singer, writer, musician, radio broadcaster, host and producer of radio and television, and journalist, music critic and music juror in television talent programs.

Expressive character featured in the Brazilian artistic culture for several decades, since the golden age of radio and Television beginning in the country, José Messias is the living history of this convergence of communication in Brazil in the 20th and 21st centuries.

References
Notes

Bibliography

 AZEVEDO, M. A . de (NIREZ) et al.. Discografia brasileira em 78 rpm. Rio de Janeiro: Funarte, 1982.
 CUNHA, José Messias da. Sob a luz das estrelas: Somos uma soma de pessoas. São Paulo: Madras, 2008 
 Microsoft do Brasil. Enciclopédia Encarta 2001. São Paulo (SP, Brasil): Microsoft do Brasil, 2001.

External links

 FRAZÃO, Osmar. A música popular brasileira contada em histórias
 Pérolas Imortais – José Messias
 Programa "Você faz o show": Jurados

1928 births
2015 deaths
People from Minas Gerais
Deaths from kidney disease
20th-century Brazilian male singers
20th-century Brazilian singers
Brazilian composers